Axiality may refer to:
Axiality (geometry), a measure of the axial symmetry of a two-dimensional shape
Axiality and rhombicity in mathematics, measures of the directional symmetry of a three-dimensional tensor
Axiality, a principle behind the art and poetry of George Quasha
Axiality in architecture, organization around a strong central axis, especially in the architecture of cathedrals and great churches and Beaux-Arts architecture

See also
Axial (disambiguation)